Columbia 300 may refer to:

Cessna 350 Corvalis (Columbia 300) light aircraft
Columbia Industries model 300 bowling ball